Ploemeur, sometimes written instead as Plœmeur, is a commune in the Morbihan department in the region of Brittany in north-western France. It is a western suburb of Lorient.

Population
The inhabitants are called the Ploemeurois. The municipality launched a linguistic plan to promote and stimulate the use of the Breton language through Ya d'ar brezhoneg on 18 April 2006.

Etymology
The current name of the city of Ploemeur comes from the old Breton Plo Meur meaning "Big Parish".

Geography
Ploemeur is close to Lorient, a sub-prefecture of Morbihan.

Photographs of the Port of Lomener

People
 Nathalie Appéré, Mayor of Rennes
 Stanislas Dupuy de Lôme (1816 in the Château de Soye - †1885), who built the first armored battleship.
 Yoann Gourcuff, born on 11 July 1986, is a footballer of Olympique Lyonnais and of the France national team.
Diego Yesso, footballer

International relations

Ploemeur is twinned with:

See also
Communes of the Morbihan department

References

External links

 Official site of Ploemeur
 Unofficial site on the history of Ploemeur and its monuments
 Ploemeur/Plañvour's page on the portal of the towns and cities of Brittany

Communes of Morbihan